Faramana is a department or commune of Houet Province in Burkina Faso.

Cities 
The department consists of a chief town :

 Faramana

and 7 villages:

 Bambe
 Although a
 Koakourima
 Kobi
 Kouni
 Siankoro
 Ty.

References 

Departments of Burkina Faso
Houet Province